Ito – a Diary of an Urban Priest is a 2009 documentary film by Finnish director Pirjo Honkasalo shot in Tokyo and portraying a young Buddhist priest Yoshinobu Fujioka.

References

2009 films
2009 documentary films
Finnish documentary films
Films directed by Pirjo Honkasalo
Documentary films about Buddhism
Films shot in Tokyo
Buddhism in Japan